Crypsitricha is a genus of moths belonging to the family Tineidae. It was first described by Edward Meyrick in 1915.

Species
Crypsitricha agriopa (Meyrick, 1888)
Crypsitricha generosa Philpott, 1926
Crypsitricha mesotypa (Meyrick, 1888)
Crypsitricha oeceotypa Diakonoff, 1955
Crypsitricha pharotoma (Meyrick, 1888)
Crypsitricha roseata (Meyrick, 1913)
Crypsitricha stereota (Meyrick, 1914)

References

Tineidae
Taxa named by Edward Meyrick
Tineidae genera